Alins is a municipality in the comarca of the Pallars Sobirà in Catalonia, Spain. It adjoins France and Andorra. It covers the valleys of the Noguera de Vallferrara and Tor rivers in the north of the comarca. The Pica d'Estats (3142 m, the highest point in Catalonia) is part of the Montcalm Massif on the frontier between this municipality and Ariège, France. A local road links the municipality with the L-504 road.

Demography 
The municipality of Alins is formed of seven villages. Those marked with an asterisk are "delocalised municipal entities" 
(entitats municipals descentralitzades) and have their own local councils with limited powers. Populations 
are given as of 2005:
Ainet de Besan (35)*
Alins (58)
Araós (29)*
Àreu (84)*
Besan (5)
Norís (12)
Tor (25), linked with Andorra by a forest track

Note 
 Entitats municipals descentralitzades are governed by the Llei Municipal i de Règim Local de Catalunya (8/1987 de 15 d'abril de 1987). They correspond to entidades locales menores in the rest of Spain (known as entitats locals menors in the Valencian Community and the Balearic Islands).

References

 Panareda Clopés, Josep Maria; Rios Calvet, Jaume; Rabella Vives, Josep Maria (1989). Guia de Catalunya, Barcelona: Caixa de Catalunya.  (Spanish).  (Catalan).

External links 
  
 Government data pages 

Municipalities in Pallars Sobirà
Populated places in Pallars Sobirà